André Pelletier (11 January 1937) is a French historian and archaeologist, a professor and specialist of ancient Rome.

Biography 
Agrégé of history, Doctor of Letters in 1972, he directed the excavations of Vienne for 15 years, the site to which he devoted his doctoral thesis. In 1963 and 1964, he uncovered Roman mosaics in the old hospital sector. He searched the Odeon from 1970 to 1976, in collaboration with P. Senay, and under his direction only from 1973. In 1974 then in 1982, he published two monographs summarizing current knowledge on ancient Vienne.

He was maître de conférences of ancient history and Roman archaeology at the Lumière University Lyon 2 from 1984.

Works 
List of his publications:
1967: Vienne, métropole civile de province (275-468 ap. J.C.) : étude critique des sources, under the direction of 
1972: Vienne antique : de la conquête romaine aux invasions alamaniques : IIe siècle avant - IIIe siècle après J.C., under the direction of Marcel Le Glay
1974: Vienne gallo-romaine au Bas-Empire : 275-468 après J.-C., Lyon, Impr. BOSC Frères
1980: Histoire de Vienne et de sa région et environs : Sainte-Colombe Saint-Romain-en-Gal, éditions Horvath, 126 p.
1988: In collaboration with André Blanc and Jean Prieur, Histoire et archéologie de la France ancienne, Rhône-Alpes, de l'âge de fer au Haut Moyen-âge, Le Coteau, éditions Horvath
2001: Vienna, Vienne, Presses universitaires de Lyon, 190 pages  

He was director of the following historical summary works:
 Grande Encyclopédie de Lyon et des communes du Rhône, Roanne, Horvath, 1980-1983
 La Médecine en Gaule : villes d'eaux, sanctuaires des eaux, Paris, Picard, 1985  
 Histoire de Lyon : des origines à nos jours, Le Coteau : Horvath, 1990

References 

20th-century French historians
French scholars of Roman history
1937 births
Living people